The 1949–50 Cypriot Cup was the 13th edition of the Cypriot Cup. A total of 8 clubs entered the competition. It began on 26 February 1950 with the quarterfinals and concluded on 23 April 1950 with the replay final which was held at GSP Stadium. EPA won their 3rd Cypriot Cup trophy after beating Anorthosis 2–1 in the final.

Format 
In the 1949–50 Cypriot Cup, participated all the teams of the Cypriot First Division.

The competition consisted of three knock-out rounds. In all rounds each tie was played as a single leg and was held at the home ground of the one of the two teams, according to the draw results. Each tie winner was qualifying to the next round. If a match was drawn, extra time was following. If extra time was drawn, there was a replay match.

Quarter-finals

Semi-finals

Final 

Abandoned at 82', due to pitch invasion.

Replay final

Sources

Bibliography

See also 
 Cypriot Cup
 1949–50 Cypriot First Division

Cypriot Cup seasons
1949–50 domestic association football cups
1949–50 in Cypriot football